Santa Bárbara is a civil parish in the municipality of Ponta Delgada on the Portuguese island of São Miguel in the Azores. The population in 2011 was 855, in an area of 8.72 km². Santa Barbara is a relatively young administrative entity, established in 1986, being de-annexed from the neighboring parish of Santo António.

Geography
Santa Bárbara is sandwiched between Santo António (along the east and south), Remédios in the northwest, Sete Cidades to the southwest, and the Atlantic Ocean to the north. It is located in the northwestern part of the island of São Miguel. Apart from its church (to the invocation of Santa Bárbara), along with a few small commercial businesses, there is a restaurant and a local soccer field.

References

Parishes of Ponta Delgada